Ehsan Ghaem-Maghami (born 11 August 1982) is an Iranian chess grandmaster (2000). He is the record holder of the Iranian Chess Championship with 13 titles.

On the September 2011 FIDE list, he had an Elo rating of 2583.

In 2004, he finished first in the Kish GM Tournament. In 2009, he won a 20-game combined match (four classical, four rapid and twelve blitz games) against Anatoly Karpov, played with the proviso that each game be played to mate or dead draw. The overall score was eight wins to Ghaem-Maghami, seven wins to Karpov, and five draws. In 2011, he finished first in the 10th Avicenna International Open Tournament in Hamadan, Iran.

Early life
Ehsan was born in Tehran and learned to play chess from his father. His rise in the chess community was swift as he won the Iranian men's championship title by age 14.

Career achievements

Guinness World Record
An Iranian grandmaster, he ousted the Israeli title holder on 9 February 2011 to regain the Guinness record for simultaneous chess games after facing more than 600 players in over 25 hours.

Ehsan Ghaem-Maghami, then 28 years old, won 97.35 percent of his games which began on 2011/02/08 in Tehran's Shahid Beheshti University, a feat reportedly making him the new Guinness title holder of the game.

"I am so happy to break the record" a victorious yet exhausted Ehsan remarked, adding "... ,but now I have to break my sleep record". Reportedly, a physician, a masseur and a dietician were monitoring him throughout the match. He said he would have put in the same zeal even if the previous title holder was a non-Israeli.
"Iran is great and deserves the best. Let's not talk politics... even if this record was held by another person, I would have gone all out to break it," he said after the matches when asked about ousting Israeli Alik Gershon.

Chess career

In October 2011, Ehsan Ghaem-Maghami was expelled from the Corsica Masters in Bastia, France for refusing to play in his scheduled match against Israeli player Ehud Shachar. Ghaem-Maghami told organizers he would not play the Israeli for political reasons. The Islamic Republic of Iran, which refuses to recognize the existence of the Jewish state, has long refused to engage in sports competition against Israel.

In 2013 he played against British Grandmaster Nigel Short in his native homeland.

References

External links

1982 births
Living people
Iranian chess players
Chess grandmasters
Asian Games bronze medalists for Iran
Asian Games medalists in chess
Chess players at the 2006 Asian Games
Chess players at the 2010 Asian Games
Medalists at the 2006 Asian Games